Xianning usually refers to a prefecture-level city in Hubei, China.

It may also refer to:

 Xianning County, a former name of Beilin District, Xi'an, in Shaanxi, China
 Xianning (275–280), an era name used by Emperor Wu of Jin
 Xianning (400–401), an era name used by Lü Zuan, emperor of Later Liang